Ousson-sur-Loire (literally Ousson on Loire) is a commune in the Loiret department in north-central France.

See also
Communes of the Loiret department

References

Oussonsurloire